The 2022–23 season is the eleventh in the history of Western Sydney Wanderers Football Club. The club is participating in the A-League Men for the eleventh time.

Players

Transfers

Transfers in

From youth squad

Transfers out

Contract extensions

Technical staff
Western Sydney Wanderers' coach for the season is Mark Rudan, who joined the Wanderers in January 2022 and 2 months later, was appointed head coach until the end of the 2023–24 season. In July 2022, the club appointed Tomi Vidovic and Adam Griffiths as assistant coaches and Pedro Ramos as the Head Analyst.

Pre-season and friendlies

Competitions

Overall record

A-League Men

League table

Results summary

Results by round

Matches

Statistics

Appearances and goals
Includes all competitions. Players with no appearances not included in the list.

Disciplinary record
Includes all competitions. The list is sorted by squad number when total cards are equal. Players with no cards not included in the list.

Clean sheets
Includes all competitions. The list is sorted by squad number when total clean sheets are equal. Numbers in parentheses represent games where both goalkeepers participated and both kept a clean sheet; the number in parentheses is awarded to the goalkeeper who was substituted on, whilst a full clean sheet is awarded to the goalkeeper who was on the field at the start and end of play. Goalkeepers with no clean sheets not included in the list.

References

Western Sydney Wanderers FC seasons
2022–23 A-League Men season by team